Willian Gomes de Siqueira (born 1 March 1986), simply known as Willian, is a Brazilian footballer who plays as a forward for Fluminense.

Club career

Early career
Born in Três Fronteiras, São Paulo, Willian joined Guarani's youth setup in 2002. He made his first team – and Série A – debut on 22 August 2004, coming on as a second half substitute for Sandro Hiroshi in a 1–1 home draw against Vasco da Gama.

Willian appeared rarely for the club during the season, as his side suffered relegation. He appeared more regularly in the following year, but was still sparingly used.

Atlético Paranaense
On 23 December 2005, Willian signed for Atlético-PR. He scored his first goal in the top tier for the club on 30 August 2006, netting the winner in a 2–1 home win against Santos.

Willian was rarely used in the following years, also suffering a knee injury in 2007. On 3 February 2009, he was loaned to Vila Nova until December.

While on loan, Willian scored eight goals during the year's Série B, being the club's top goalscorer as his side avoided relegation. Highlights included braces against Campinense (two times) and América-RN.

On 26 January 2010, after returning from loan, Willian rescinded his contract with Atlético.

Figueirense
In February 2010, Willian joined Figueirense. He was the top goalscorer of Campeonato Catarinense with 13 goals in only 15 matches, being also elected the best player of the tournament.

Willian also scored a further 12 goals during the Série B championship, being one of the key units as the club achieved top level promotion as second.

Corinthians
On 3 January 2011, Willian signed for Corinthians, with Atlético still retaining part ownership. He made his debut for the club late in the month, replacing Morais in a 2–2 draw at São Bernardo.

Willian scored his first goals for Timão on 13 March 2011, netting a brace in a 3–2 away win against Mirassol. Mainly used as a substitute during the Campeonato Paulista, he became a regular starter for the club during the year's Brasileirão; he scored a double in a 2–0 home win against Fluminense on 12 June.

Willian also appeared regularly in 2012 Copa Libertadores, helping Corinthians to lift their first-ever title in the competition.

Metalist Kharkiv

On 2 July 2012, Willian moved abroad, signing for Ukrainian Premier League club FC Metalist Kharkiv. He scored his first goal abroad on 18 August, netting the second in a 3–0 win at FC Hoverla Uzhhorod.

Willian made his continental debut on 23 August 2012, starting in a 2–0 away win against FC Dinamo București in the UEFA Europa League. Again mainly used as a substitute, he returned to his homeland in the following year.

Cruzeiro
On 14 July 2013, Willian signed a one-year loan deal with Cruzeiro, with Diego Souza moving permanently in the opposite direction. Roughly one year later, he was bought outright for a fee of €3.5 million; he also appeared regularly as his side achieved back-to-back Brasileirão titles in 2013 and 2014.

During the 2015 campaign, Willian became an undisputed starter under new manager Mano Menezes; during the manager's debut on 6 September, he scored four goals in a 5–1 home routing of Figueirense.

Palmeiras
On 11 January 2017, Willian signed for Palmeiras after being involved in an exchange with Robinho. Regularly used in his first year, he won the 2018 Série A with the club, and finished the year with 17 goals overall.

After scoring another 16 goals in 2018, Willian spent the most of the 2019 campaign sidelined due to a knee injury. In the 2020 season, he won the Campeonato Paulista, the Copa do Brasil and the Copa Libertadores, but did not feature in the latter's Final.

On 26 June 2021, Willian renewed his contract with Verdão until December 2022.

Career statistics

Honours

Club
Corinthians
Campeonato Brasileiro Série A: 2011
Copa Libertadores: 2012

Cruzeiro
Campeonato Brasileiro Série A: 2013, 2014
Campeonato Mineiro: 2014

Palmeiras
Campeonato Brasileiro Série A: 2018
Campeonato Paulista: 2020
Copa do Brasil: 2020
Copa Libertadores: 2020, 2021

Fluminense
 Campeonato Carioca: 2022

Individual
Campeonato Catarinense Best player: 2010
Campeonato Catarinense Team of the year: 2010
Campeonato Paulista Team of the year: 2020

References

External links

Furacão profile 

1986 births
Living people
Brazilian footballers
Association football forwards
Campeonato Brasileiro Série A players
Campeonato Brasileiro Série B players
Guarani FC players
Club Athletico Paranaense players
Vila Nova Futebol Clube players
Figueirense FC players
Sport Club Corinthians Paulista players
Cruzeiro Esporte Clube players
Sociedade Esportiva Palmeiras players
Fluminense FC players
Ukrainian Premier League players
FC Metalist Kharkiv players
Brazilian expatriate footballers
Expatriate footballers in Ukraine
Brazilian expatriate sportspeople in Ukraine